Pandam Amada (English: In Pursuit Of) is a 2019 Indian Meitei language film directed by O. Gautam and produced by Sarokons. It stars Bonney Takhelmayum and Archana Konsam in the lead roles. The film was premiered at MSFDS on 8 September 2019. It was world premiered at the 18th International Dhaka Film Festival held at Dhaka, Bangladesh from 11 to 19 January 2020. Pandam Amada was selected among 15 films screened in the Children's Film Section of the festival.

The film also got selections in the 18th Third Eye Asian Film Festival, Mumbai and Tokyo Lift-Off Film Festival, 2020. The movie was nominated for 9th MANIFA 2020 under various categories. It won many awards, including the Best Feature Film Award in the Manipur State Film Awards 2020.

Synopsis
Malem is an innocent, a kind-hearted and a sporty boy. He has a close childhood friend called Nganba. The two close friends get separated after passing out together from high school as the former joins a new school under his father's recommendation. Malem gets to meet a new circle of friends and his life rolls up to the phase of mischievous behaviour and eventually, he gets caught being drunk by police. While Malem struggles to recover from the trauma of the incident, his friend Nganba faces health complications and gets hospitalised. When Malem learns that Nganba's condition is critical and needs money for operation, he decides to take part in a marathon race with a strong intention to win. Now, Malem's only objective is to help his friend by putting the winning cash prize in the operation.

Cast
 Bonney Takhelmayum as Malem
 Archana Konsam as Bembem
 Raju Nong as Malem's father
 Maya Choudhury as Yaiphabi, Malem's mother
 Ningthoujam Rina as Tombi, Nganba's mother
 Naoton H. as Nganba
 Sanu Thokchom as Lemba
 Heikrujam Kerish
 Sandip Pukhram
 Sagar Maibam
 Ghanashyam Khangembam
 Sorokhaibam Saratchandra

Soundtrack
Tony Aheibam composed the soundtrack for the film and Eikhoi Yambung wrote the lyrics. The songs are titled Naken Tha and Exam Loire. Naken Tha became a hit song number and reached more than 8 million views on YouTube. The online copyrights of the songs were procured by Mami Taibang.

Accolades 
Pandam Amada won many awards at the 13th Manipur State Film Awards 2020, including the Best Feature Film Award. At the 9th MANIFA 2020, the movie won four awards out of the 14 nominations. The award ceremonies for both were postponed and held in 2021 due to the COVID-19 pandemic.

References

External links
 

2010s Meitei-language films
2019 films